Erol Ozensoy (born 1953), a self-made Turkish entrepreneur, industrialist and businessmen, who founded Kimetsan, one of the largest chemical companies in Turkey today.

Biography
Ozensoy was born 1953 in Hatay, Turkey. He was educated in chemical engineering and chemistry, at the Ankara University. After having his master of science degree in Turkey, he won the scholarship of Turkish Government and studied metallurgical engineering at the Colorado School of Mines. After completing his second master's degree, he got his Ph.D. at the Imperial College London in hydrometallurgy.  He then returned home to teach at Middle East Technical University and after 1986, he founded Kimetsan company. Currently, Ozensoy is the chairman of Kimetsan.  He is married to Hatice, and he has 2 children  Elvin Merve Ozensoy and  Erdem Duhan Özensoy.

References
 http://hurarsiv.hurriyet.com.tr/goster/haber.aspx?id=7073751&tarih=2007-08-13

External links
 The Kimetsan Company official website

1953 births
Living people
People from İskenderun
Turkish chemical engineers
Turkish businesspeople